St James' Mission Church, Long Eaton is a former church in the Church of England Diocese of Derby in Long Eaton, Derbyshire.

History
It was intended as a mission church for St Laurence's Church, Long Eaton to serve the expanding population to the south of the town of Long Eaton.

The foundation stone was laid on 19 January 1886 by Joseph Billyeald at the site on Tamworth Road. It was designed by the architect John Sheldon of Long Eaton and built by Mr Pirks of Long Eaton. It was designed to accommodate around 450 worshippers.

It was opened for worship by the Bishop of Southwell, Rt Revd George Ridding on 9 July 1886.

The church hall behind the church was opened on 4 July 1908 by Revd. Canon Maden, Rector of Plumtree. It cost £1,100 to build.

It closed for worship in 1952.

References

Long Eaton
Churches completed in 1886
Former churches in Derbyshire
Long Eaton